Tracy W. King is a United States Marine Corps Major General who currently serves as the Commanding General of the United States Marine Forces Europe and Africa.  He has held this billet since May 6, 2021. Previously, he served as the Director of Expeditionary Warfare advising the Chief of Naval Operations on all things expeditionary, and as the Director for Asia, advising the Chairman of the Joint Chiefs of Staff on all matters related to Asia..

References

Living people
Place of birth missing (living people)
Recipients of the Defense Superior Service Medal
Recipients of the Legion of Merit
United States Marine Corps generals
United States Marine Corps personnel of the Iraq War
Year of birth missing (living people)